Andre Rohde (born 18 August 1975) is a German former weightlifter. He competed in the men's heavyweight event at the 2004 Summer Olympics.

References

External links
 

1975 births
Living people
German male weightlifters
Olympic weightlifters of Germany
Weightlifters at the 2004 Summer Olympics
People from Görlitz
Sportspeople from Saxony
21st-century German people